This is about the Cassville Municipal Airport in Wisconsin (C74). For the airport in Missouri with the same name (94K), see Cassville Municipal Airport (Missouri)

Cassville Municipal Airport is a public use airport located approximately one nautical mile southeast of Cassville, Wisconsin, United States, along the banks of the Mississippi River. The field elevation is 627 feet above mean sea level, and the FAA location identifier is C74.

The airport has a single runway, designated 11/29, with an asphalt surface, 3,000 feet long by 50 feet wide. As of June 2019, the runway surface was reported to be in poor condition, with numerous cracks and vegetation growing on the entire pavement length.

The airport is owned by the Village of Cassville.

In January 2023, there were 8 aircraft based at this airport: 7 single-engine aircraft and 1 ultra-light.

There are an average of 41 aircraft operations per week, with 75% of the traffic being local general aviation, 24% transient general aviation and 1% air taxi operations.

See also 
 List of airports in Wisconsin

References

External links 
FAA Airport Information for C74
AOPA (Aircraft Owners and Pilot's Association) Information Page for C74
SkyVector Aeronautical Charts for C74
FlightAware information page for C74, including a live flight tracker

Buildings and structures in Grant County, Wisconsin
Airports in Wisconsin